Analogia legis is the concept that legal consequences arise from the wording and comparison of statutes. When that is not possible then analogia iuris may be applicable, whereby legal consequences derive from Constitutional law.

See also
Analogy

References

Law